Kendukuchi is a census village in Nalbari district, Assam, India. As per the 2011 Census of India, Kendukuchi village has a total population of 2,390 people including 1,237 males and 1,153 females.

Kendukuchi carries a history of being militancy affected area.

References 

Assam